was a UK company law decision of House of Lords that settled a number of outstanding legal issues relating to floating charges and recharacterisation risk under the English common law. However, the House of Lords also discussed the power of the court to make rulings as to the law that were "prospective only" to mitigate potential harshness when issuing a ruling that was different from what the law had previously been understood to be.

Facts
Spectrum Plus Ltd ("Spectrum") carried on the business of a manufacturer of dyes, paints, pigments and other chemical products for the paint industry. Spectrum opened an overdraft facility, and made an agreement with, National Westminster Bank Plc ("NatWest") that said it was granting a fixed charge, or in the words of the contract, a "specific charge [of] all book debts and other debts… now and from time to time due or owing to [Spectrum]" to secure a £250,000 overdraft. Spectrum was prohibited from charging or assigning debts, and was required to pay the proceeds of collection into a NatWest account. But there were no restrictions on Spectrum’s operation of the account. Spectrum’s account was always overdrawn but it used the proceeds of the debts as and when it was necessary. When Spectrum went into liquidation, NatWest argued that the charge was a fixed charge over book debts and proceeds. The Inland Revenue, which was a major creditor, argued the debenture was merely a floating charge, so its claim for tax owed took priority over the bank under Insolvency Act 1986 section 175. At stake was merely £16,136, but the case was a test case.

It was apparent that if the House of Lords decided in favour of the Inland Revenue, the expectations of a significant number of banks, who had relied on being able to have "fixed charges" and thus absolute priority in insolvency, would be defeated. Many people had assumed, or at least argued they had assumed that the law since Siebe Gorman & Co Ltd v Barclays Bank Ltd was that if book debts were paid into a separate account, then a charge over them would be deemed to be fixed. Accordingly, it was submitted that if the Lords were to overrule Siebe Gorman, they should only do so prospectively, and not retrospectively.

Judgment
In the High Court, the Vice Chancellor held, applying the ruling of Lord Millett in the Privy Council decision of Agnew v Commissioners of Inland Revenue (Re Brumark) and declining to follow Re New Bullas Trading Ltd, that because the charge allowed Spectrum to use the proceeds of the debts in the normal course of business it must have been a floating charge (therefore not following Siebe Gorman & Co Ltd v Barclays Bank Ltd either). In the Court of Appeal, Lord Phillips MR held that he was bound by Bullas and where a chargor is prohibited from disposing of receivables before they are collected and must pay them into a chargee’s account, the charge must be construed as fixed. He said Siebe Gorman was correctly decided given that the debenture there clearly restricted the company’s ability to draw on the bank account into which the proceeds of the book debts were paid. The Siebe Gorman form of debenture had been followed for 25 years, and therefore had acquired meaning. Jonathan Parker LJ and Jacob LJ concurred.

House of Lords

The House of Lords, with seven members given the constitutional issue of retrospective rulings, held that the charge over Spectrum Plus Ltd's book debts was floating, because the hallmark of a floating charge is that the business is free to deal with the assets in business as usual. Also relevant, but not determinative were the extent of the restrictions imposed by the debenture, the rights retained by Spectrum to deal with its debtors and collect the money owed by them, Spectrum's right to draw on its account with the bank into which the collected debts had to be paid, provided it kept within the overdraft limit, the description "fixed charge" attributed to the charge by the parties themselves. Even though the money was put into a separate account, that was the case here. The decision of Slade J in Siebe Gorman & Co Ltd v Barclays Bank had been subject to serious academic criticism, and had been doubted by Hoffmann J in Re Brightlife Ltd. Although Siebe Gorman was followed and extended by the English Court of Appeal in Re New Bullas Trading Ltd it was wrong and was overruled. Recognising freedom to deal with assets as the hallmark of a floating charge was necessary to give effect to the purpose of the legislation on floating charges, and the statutory system of priority.

Lord Scott gave a concurring opinion and said the following.

Prospective rulings

Regarding the prospective ruling issue, Lord Nicholls said that judges had been described as "developing" the law for some time when making novel decisions, and that a judge is not free to repeal laws or distance themselves from bad laws; their only power is to impose a new interpretation. He also noted the new "dynamic" power to interpret statutes under section 3 of the Human Rights Act 1998. He then went on to rule:

He held that in exceptional cases, it would be open to the court to hold that a new interpretation of the law should be applied only prospectively. However, on the facts of the case before him, Lord Hope felt that it was "miles away from the exceptional category in which alone prospective overruling would be legitimate" (para 43) and so relegated his comments upon prospective only rulings to obiter dictum. However, given the strength and number of the court, and that the court specifically invited the Attorney General to appoint leading counsel to address them on that point, it seems clear that the decision on that point will be treated as binding precedent.

Significance
In relation to the substantive issues, the Revenue had already indicated that it would not seek to reopen recent liquidations that had been distributed in compliance with the understandings of the old law so in many senses, the ruling took prospective effect only with respect to the largest preferred creditor. The drafting of security documents has also been modified by the legal profession, and debentures now usually contain provisions stating that the proceeds of book debts may not be assigned and must be paid into a blocked account.

Prior to the decision, "prospective only" rulings were not favoured under English law. In Launchbury v Morgans [1973] AC 127 (at 137), Lord Wilberforce had expressed that view that "We cannot, without yet further innovation, change the law prospectively only". More recently, in Kleinwort Benson Ltd v Lincoln City Council [1999] 2 AC 349 (at 379), Lord Goff of Chieveley had said the system of prospective overruling "has no place in our legal system".

See also

On company law
Floating charge
Voidable floating charge

On constitutional law
Precedent
Stare decisis
Bush v Gore, where the US Supreme Court decided its decision was effective for the 2000 Republican victory, but not necessarily otherwise.

Notes

External links
Nat West Bank v Spectrum - full case report
Fixed and floating charges after Spectrum
Ramifications of Spectrum

United Kingdom company case law
House of Lords cases
English property case law
United Kingdom insolvency case law
2005 in case law
2005 in British law
NatWest Group litigation
United Kingdom constitutional case law